USS Dixie has been the name of more than one United States Navy ship, and may refer to:
   
 , a ship in commission as an auxiliary cruiser from 1898 to 1899, as a training ship from 1899 to 1902, as a transport from 1903 to 1905 and from 1906 to 1907, and as a destroyer tender from 1909 to 1922
 , a destroyer tender in commission from 1940 to 1982

It may also refer to:

, later USS SP-701, a patrol boat in commission from 1917 to 1919

United States Navy ship names